The following lists events that happened during 1861 in Liberia.

Incumbents
President: Stephen Allen Benson
Vice President: Daniel Bashiel Warner
Chief Justice: Boston Jenkins Drayton

Events

May
 May 7 – Liberian constitutional referendum, 1861

Births
 August 4 – Daniel Edward Howard, President of Liberia (1912–1920), in Buchanan (d. 1935)

References

 
Years of the 19th century in Liberia